Katabi Ko'y Mamaw is a 1991 Philippine comedy horror film directed by Mike Relon Makiling. The film stars the Reycard Duet, along with Donita Rose as the titular ghost. Named after the duo's hit song from the 70s, this marks their first film in 15 years.

Cast
 Rey Ramirez as Michael
 Carding Castro as Jordan
 Berting Labra as Rollie
 Lucita Soriano as Aida
 Lyn D'Amour as Taxi Driver
 Tanya Gomez as Holdupper
 Maita Sanchez as Holdupper
 Rudy Meyer as Sgt. Lolomboy
 Dencio Padilla as Desk Officer
 Don Pepot as Security Guard
 Alex Pareja as Police Artist
 Jeffrey Santos as Tony
 German Moreno as Luigi
 Lou Veloso as Restaurant Manager
 Apple Pie Bautista as Girlie
 Larry Silva as Restaurant Customer
 Jon Achaval as Manolo
 Moody Diaz as Matilda
 Manny Castañeda as Manny
 Khryss Adalia as Chris
 Jovit Moya as Brando
 Chinkee Tan as Hammer
 Paeng Giant as Paeng
 Yoyoy Villame as Brgy. Official
 Beverly Salviejo as Debbie
 Ana Roces as Celia
 Bert Mansueto as Berto
 Josie Tagle as Josie
 Evelyn Vargas as Eva
 Alvaro Arceo as Boying
 Donita Rose as Rossana
 Nanding Fernandez as Engracio
 Gloria Romero as Lucinda
 Romy Diaz as Blacky

References

External links

1991 films
1991 action films
Filipino-language films
Philippine comedy films
Philippine comedy horror films
Films directed by Mike Relon Makiling